Goes pulverulentus is a species of beetle in the family Cerambycidae. It was described by Haldeman in 1847, originally under the genus Monohammus. It is known from North America.

References

Lamiini
Beetles described in 1847